Luigi Nono was an Italian composer.

Luigi Nono may also refer to:

Luigi Nono (painter), the composer's grandfather

See also
 Luigi (disambiguation)
 Nono (disambiguation)